Nic Newman (born 15 January 1993) is a professional Australian rules footballer playing for the Carlton Football Club in the Australian Football League (AFL). He was drafted by the Sydney Swans with their second selection and thirty-fifth overall in the 2015 rookie draft. At the conclusion of the 2018 season, Newman was traded to Carlton. He made his debut for Carlton in the Round 1 match against Richmond at the MCG. Newman impressed, gathering 26 disposals and kicking a classy goal in the 33 point loss.
In his second game against his former club, Newman collected 32 disposals in a best on ground performance. His efforts were a pivotal part in Carlton’s fourth win of the 2019 season. Newman is a reliable force for Carlton's backline. He is consistent with his efforts and always goes under the radar as the leagues most underrated player. Newman has 2 attractive brothers, one in the VFL (Josh) and the other is a standout actor (Mavacado).

Statistics
 Statistics are correct to end of Round 23 2021

|- style="background:#eaeaea;"
! scope="row" style="text-align:center" | 2017
| style="text-align:center" | 
| 28 || 20 || 7 || 7 || 260 || 146 || 406 || 95 || 75 || 0.4 || 0.4 || 13.0 || 7.3 || 20.3 || 4.8 || 3.8
|-
! scope="row" style="text-align:center" | 2018
| style="text-align:center" | 
| 28 || 11 || 1 || 0 || 127 || 66 || 193 || 60 || 33 || 0.1 || 0.0 || 11.5 || 6.0 || 17.5 || 5.5 || 3.0
|- style="background:#eaeaea;"
! scope="row" style="text-align:center" | 2019
| style="text-align:center" | 
| 24 || 20 || 6 || 2 || 328 || 100 || 428 || 135 || 66 || 0.3 || 0.1 || 16.4 || 5.0 || 21.4 || 6.8 || 3.3
|-
! scope="row" style="text-align:center" | 2020
| style="text-align:center" | 
| 24 || 2 || 0 || 0 || 13 || 2 || 15 || 4 || 2 || 0.0 || 0.0 || 6.5 || 1.0 || 7.5 || 2.0 || 1.0
|-
! scope="row" style="text-align:center" | 2021
| style="text-align:center" | 
| 24 || 14 || 0 || 1 || 199 || 76 || 275 || 86 || 54 || 0.0 || 0.1 || 14.2 || 5.4 || 19.6 || 6.1 || 3.9
|- class="sortbottom"
! colspan=3| Career
! 67
! 14
! 10
! 927
! 390
! 1317
! 380
! 230
! 0.2
! 0.1
! 13.8
! 5.8
! 19.6
! 5.6
! 3.4
|}

References

External links

1993 births
Living people
Carlton Football Club players
Sydney Swans players
Frankston Football Club players
Australian rules footballers from Victoria (Australia)